Calcagni is a surname of Italian origin. Notable people with the surname include:

Antonio Calcagni (1538–1593), Italian sculptor
Patrick Calcagni (born 1977), Swiss professional road bicycle racer 
Ron Calcagni (1957), American former football quarterback 
Tiberio Calcagni (1532–1565), Italian sculptor

Italian-language surnames